L. D. S. "Chippy" Gunasekara (1905 – 8 January 1974) was a cricketer and lawyer who played first-class cricket for Ceylon from 1929 to 1935.

Although he was only five feet three inches tall and played in spectacles, "Chippy" Gunasekera was a good left-handed opening batsman with a strong defence, and a fine cover fieldsman. He toured India in 1932-33, top-scoring in Ceylon's first-ever first-class victory, in the match against Patiala, when he made 57 in the first innings, the only fifty on either side. He captained Ceylon in the match against the Australians in 1935-36, top-scoring in Ceylon's second innings. In club cricket in Colombo he formed an outstanding opening partnership with Mohotti Albert, and later in his career he became one of Ceylon's best leg-spin bowlers.

Later Gunasekara was one of the leading criminal lawyers in Ceylon. He was also a prominent cricket coach.

References

External links

1905 births
1974 deaths
Sri Lankan cricketers
All-Ceylon cricketers
Alumni of Royal College, Colombo
Sinhalese Sports Club cricketers
20th-century Sri Lankan lawyers
Sri Lankan cricket coaches